Salvador is the first studio album released by the Christian band Salvador in 2000.

Track listing

Personnel

Salvador 
 Nick Gonzales – lead vocals, guitars
 Adrian Lopez – keyboards, vocals 
 Josh Gonzales – bass, vocals 
 Art Gonzales – drums
 Eliot Torres – percussion, vocals

Additional musicians 
 Jeffery Roach – keyboards
 George Cocchini – electric guitar, gut-string guitar
 Sam Levine – saxophones
 Barry Green – trombone
 Mike Haynes – trumpet
 Steve Patrick – trumpet
 Michael Mellett – backing vocals 
 Chris Rodriguez – backing vocals 
 First Church ECI (Municie, Indiana) – choir
 Clint Dunn – choir director
 Bob Clark, Lisa Dunn, Jeni Friedersdorf, Benji Gaither, Dan Jeffers, Laura Ontjes, Mariano Rodriguez de Ledesma, Christina Smith, Holly Smith, Marj Smith and Cami Wyatt – additional choir, backing vocals

Production 
 Monroe Jones – producer 
 Dan Posthuma – producer, executive producer 
 Jim Dineen – recording 
 Mark Linger – recording 
 David Schober – recording 
 Shane D. Wilson – recording, mixing
 Tera Wilson – recording assistant 
 Nathan Zwalt – recording assistant 
 J.C. Monterrosa – mix assistant 
 Stephen Marcussen – mastering
 Jamie Kiner – A&R coordinator 
 Beth Lee – art direction 
 Louis LaPrad – design 
 Tony Baker – photography 
 Chad Curry – wardrobe stylist 
 Bridget Cook – grooming 
 Michael Smith & Associates – management 

Studios
 Recorded at The Spank Factory, Screaming Baby and Criminal Recording (Franklin, Tennessee); White House Studios (Leicester, UK).
 Mixed at The Sound Kitchen (Franklin, Tennessee).
 Mastered at Marcussen Mastering (Hollywood, California).

References

2000 albums
Salvador (band) albums